Worn Copy is the seventh studio album by the American recording artist Ariel Pink, under his "Haunted Graffiti" musical project. It is the eighth release in the eponymous series of works and was released on the label, Rhystop, in 2003. It was reissued by Paw Tracks in 2005 with the bonus video, "For Kate I Wait."

Track listing

References 

2003 albums
Ariel Pink albums
New Weird America albums